Carlo Ceresa (January 20, 1609 – January 29, 1679) was an Italian painter of the Baroque period active mainly around Bergamo.

Biography
Born in 1609 at San Giovanni Bianco, a town in the Brembana Valley in the province of Bergamo, Ceresa was a pupil and then assistant of the Milanese painter Daniele Crespi, whose style and vocabulary lived on in his work after the master’s death in 1630. He was active in the area of Bergamo and produced a large number of religious works characterised by a sober, understated approach combined with the vivid color of the Veneto school for the many churches and sanctuaries there. He was also a skilful portrait painter whose services were sought after by the noble families of the city. The naturalism pervading the depiction of his subjects recalls the work of Moroni and looks forward to Fra Galgario and Ceruti (Pitochetto). He died in Bergamo in 1679.

References
 Domenico Sedini, Carlo Ceresa, online catalogue Artgate by Fondazione Cariplo, 2010, CC BY-SA (source for biography).

External links

Painters of reality: the legacy of Leonardo and Caravaggio in Lombardy, an exhibition catalog from The Metropolitan Museum of Art (fully available online as PDF), which contains material on Ceresa (see index)

1609 births
1679 deaths
17th-century Italian painters
Italian male painters
Painters from Bergamo
Italian Baroque painters
Italian portrait painters